The Northland Rugby Union is the governing body for rugby union in Northland, New Zealand; Northland is a region of New Zealand that covers areas in the districts of Far North, Kaipara, and Whangārei. Established in 1920, they represent the Bunnings NPC side, Northland Taniwha, and Farah Palmer Cup side, Northland Kauri. It is also affiliated with the Blues Super Rugby franchise. Their home playing colours are sky blue and they play their home games at Semenoff Stadium in Morningside.

Affiliated clubs 
There are currently 39 registered clubs incorporated and secondary schools affiliated with the Northland Rugby Union, most of which have teams at both senior and junior levels.

Awanui Rugby Football Club
Dargaville High School
Eastern United Rugby & Sports Club
The Hora Hora Rugby Union Football Club
Kaeo Rugby and Sports Club
Kaihu Valley Rugby Football Club
Kaikohe Rugby Football and Sports Club
Kaitaia City Rugby Union Football Club
Kaitaia College
Kamo High School
Kamo Rugby and Squash Club
Kerikeri High School
Kerikeri Rugby Union Football Club
Mangakahia Rugby Club
Mid-Northern Rugby Football Club
Midwestern Rugby Union And Squash Club
Moerewa Rugby Football and Recreation Sports Club
Northland College
Old Boys Marist Rugby & Sports Club
Old Boys Rugby Football & Softball Club
Onerahi Rugby Football Club
Otamatea Hawks Rugby Club
Rodney College
Taiamai Ohaeawai Rugby Football and Sports Club
Te Rarawa Rugby Club
The Aupouri Rugby Football and Sports Club
The City Rugby Union Football Club
The Dargaville Rugby and Sports Club
The Hikurangi Rugby Union Football Club
The Okaihau Rugby Union Football and Sports Club
The Otiria Rugby Union Football and Sports Club
The Southern Football Club
The Tomarata Rugby Football Club
Tikipunga Rugby Club
United Kawakawa Rugby Football Club
Waipu Rugby Squash Club
Wellsford Rugby Football Club
Whangārei Boys' High School
Whangaruru Rugby Football Club

Bunnings NPC

History

Early years 
Northland Rugby Union was known as North Auckland Rugby Union following the amalgamation of Whangārei, Northern Wairoa, Bay of Islands, and Otamatea initially and then followed by Mangonui, Kaipara, Hokianga, Whangaroa, and Rodney in 1925. Rugby union was first played in Northland in late 1880, and the first union was set up in the province in 1895, known as the Marsden Football Union. In 1994, North Auckland changed its name to the Northland Rugby Football Union. They played their first ever match as a union on 3 August 1920, in an 11-0 victory over South Island Country. However, they did not play their first inter-union match until 27 July 1922, an 8-6 loss to Auckland. Their first inter-union win came in August 1923, when they beat King Country

The Auckland Rugby Union and Northland Rugby Union became regular rivals. They had Ranfurly Shield victories over them in 1960 and 1971. Northland won the Ranfurly Shield on two further occasions. 1950, when they defeated South Canterbury and 1978, when they defeated Manawatu. In the 1971 challenge Northland won 17-12 in a narrow match played in front of 47,000 people at Eden Park, Auckland. The following season 40,000 spectators packed Whangārei Okara Park to watch the rematch. With the city's population only 34,000, this showcased the significance of both the shield and the rivalry with Auckland. However they lost 15-16.

The reputation of Northland rugby took a downfall following its controversial victory over Manawatu in 1978. After what seemed to be an excessive amount of stoppage time, Northland kicked a winning penalty. What followed was the refusal that the union wouldn’t put the shield on the line for its final home matches of the season against Southland and Otago. However no rules were broken.

Professional era 
Northland began their professional era playing in the inaugural Air New Zealand Cup competition. They are known as the Taniwha, a reference to the mascot adopted in the professional era. Along with Auckland and North Harbour, Northland is part of the Blues Super Rugby franchise.

Season standings 
The following is a summary of every season for the Northland Taniwha since 2006. Position indicates the teams regular season finish.

Key:

Blue bar denotes Championship division

Records and statistics

All Blacks 
Northland has produced 32 All Blacks to date. Below is a list of Northland New Zealand national rugby union players along with their All Black number, year of debut and number of All Black games.

References

External links
Official site
Northland rugby (NZHistory.net.nz)

New Zealand rugby union teams
New Zealand rugby union governing bodies
Rugby clubs established in 1920
Sport in the Northland Region
Sports organizations established in 1920